Yenimahalle is an underground station on the M3 line of the Istanbul Metro in Bağcılar, Istanbul. The station is located beneath Dökümcüler Avenue in the Yenimahalle neighborhood of Bağcılar. Yenimahalle was opened on 14 June 2013 along with the Kirazlı-MetroKent portion of the M3.

Station Layout

References

External links
Yenimahalle station portal in Google Street View

Railway stations opened in 2013
Istanbul metro stations
2013 establishments in Turkey